Lukas Rotpuller (born 31 March 1991) is an Austrian footballer of Croatian descent who plays as a defender.

Career
On 22 February 2018, Rotpuller signed for Real Valladolid for the remainder of the 2017-18 season.

References

External links

1991 births
Living people
Austrian footballers
Austrian people of Croatian descent
Austria youth international footballers
Austrian Football Bundesliga players
SV Ried players
FK Austria Wien players
Association football defenders
Real Valladolid players
People from Eisenstadt
Footballers from Burgenland